Vert skating or vertical skating is a discipline using skates like inline skates or roller skates on a vert ramp, a style of half-pipe. In vert skating, the skater is able to achieve more air-time as compared to other styles of skating, meaning skaters can perform complicated aerial maneuvers and acrobatic tricks, such as spins and flips.

The intent of vert skating is to ride higher than the coping (the metal pipe on top of the ramp) and perform spins or flips. It focuses on complicated aerial maneuvers, such as spins and flips. The intent of the skater is to build speed until they are of sufficient height above the edge of the ramp to perform various aerial acrobatics. In competitions skaters have limited time, often less than a minute, to impress the judges by landing numerous and difficult tricks, having a good flow and consistency, having creativity with the routine and most importantly having a good style.

The first X Games, in 1995, featured four inline skating events: best trick/big air, men's and women's vert, men's street, and men's downhill. At its heyday in 1998, inline skating had the most events of any sport at the X Games, featuring vert triples (a three-person team based vert event), women's street, and women's downhill in addition to the original events. 

However, the sport soon fell out of fashion and by 2004, vert skating was the only remaining event at the X Games – including just one men's and women's combined contest. For the 2005 X Games, aggressive inline was dropped entirely and the vert competition was replaced by women's skateboarding.

Vert skating is considered a challenging sport: as of 2012 there are fewer than 15 professional vert skaters attending competitions.

X Games results

Men's vert 

Sources:

Women's vert 

Sources:

Vert triples 
Vert triples was a mixed-gender team AIL vert event and was included at two X Games, 1998 in San Diego and 1999 in San Francisco. Fabiola da Silva and Ayumi Kawasaki competed on a triples team with Andre Englehart in 1999. Maki Komori is the only woman to have medaled in vert triples at the X Games, winning bronze as part of a team with the Yasutoko brothers, Takeshi and Eito, in 1999.

Sources:

Vert 
Men's and women's vert were combined at the 2004 X Games in Los Angeles. Fabiola da Silva was the only woman to qualify for participation in the event and placed sixth in the finals.

Sources:

Other notable vert skaters 

Skaters who participated in vert events at the X Games but did not medal or who participated at other major international events include:

Alberto Arakaki (BRA)
 Mike Bennett (USA)
 Katie Brown (USA)
Tobias Bucher (GER)
 Scott Crawford (AUS)
 Ryan Dawes (USA)
Judy Eilmes (USA)
 Andre Englehart (USA)
 Lamine Fathi (FRA)
 Aaron Feinberg (USA)
 Jaren Grob (USA)
 Carl Hills (USA)
 Beni Huber (SUI)
 Anis Iboulalen (FRA)
 Eitan Kramer (USA)
 Rui Kitamura (JPN)
 Matt Lindenmuth (USA)
 Paul Malina (AUS)
 Randy Marino (USA)
 Thumper Nagasako (USA)
 Elmer Pillon (CAN)
 Shawn Robertson (USA)
 Vinicius Rosa (BRA)
 Michelle Scott (USA)
 Kerstin von Rautenfeld (BRA)

See also
Half-pipe skiing
Mega ramp
Superpipe

References

 
Acrobatic sports
Athletic sports
Roller skating